Mamuka Tsereteli (born 18 January 1979) is a Georgian former footballer.

Tsereteli started his career at Georgian football giant Dinamo Tbilisi. He was the National team under 21 captain for several years. He played for Latvia, then in Russia. He also played two games in Belgium at the start of the 2001–2002 season. After playing outside Georgia at a young age, he returned to the Caucasus in 2003.

Tsereteli capped once in UEFA Euro 2000 qualifying. He was recalled in 2004 and played 3 friendlies.

After ending his football playing career, Mamuka Tsereteli began working as a football players' manager and agent, searching for new talent all around the world. Since then, he has earned his UEFA B coaching license and USSF E and F coaching licenses.  He currently coaches youth soccer in the Chicago, Illinois area.

References

External links

Profile at VI

Interview
Mamuka Tsereteli at Sport.ua 

Footballers from Georgia (country)
Expatriate footballers from Georgia (country)
Georgia (country) international footballers
FC Dinamo Tbilisi players
FK Ventspils players
Skonto FC players
FC Spartak Vladikavkaz players
Lierse S.K. players
Nea Salamis Famagusta FC players
Russian Premier League players
Belgian Pro League players
Cypriot First Division players
Expatriate footballers in Latvia
Expatriate footballers in Russia
Expatriate footballers in Belgium
Expatriate footballers in Cyprus
Expatriate footballers in Iran
Association football defenders
1979 births
Living people
Expatriate sportspeople from Georgia (country) in Latvia
Association football agents
People from Mtskheta
Expatriate sportspeople from Georgia (country) in Iran
Expatriate sportspeople from Georgia (country) in Cyprus
Expatriate sportspeople from Georgia (country) in Belgium
Expatriate sportspeople from Georgia (country) in Russia
Expatriate footballers in Vietnam
Expatriate sportspeople from Georgia (country) in Vietnam
Erovnuli Liga players